Pseudophoxinus anatolicus, also known as the giant spring minnow or Anatolian minnow, is a species of freshwater fish in the family Cyprinidae. It is found only in Central Anatolia, Turkey, at a few localities. These include Lake Akgöl, Saz Lake with tributaries and Eregli marshes. It was also found in  Lake Beysehir, but was extirpated there.

References

Pseudophoxinus
Endemic fauna of Turkey
Fish described in 1925
Taxonomy articles created by Polbot